Manuel Sánchez Palomeque (born 1 January 1967) is a Spanish retired footballer who played as a midfielder, and a former manager of Lorca Deportiva CF.

Club career
Born in Cartagena, Murcia, Palomeque only appeared with amateur clubs well into his 20s. In 1989, he joined UD Salamanca in Segunda División, making his debut as a professional on 17 December 1989, in a 1–0 away win against Real Madrid Castilla.

Palomeque appeared in just five league games for the Castile and León, and was released. He subsequently resumed his career in Segunda División B and Tercera División, representing Cartagena FC, Real Murcia, AD Ceuta and FC Cartagena.

Palomeque retired with the Efesé in 1998, aged 31, mainly due to injuries.

Manager career
After being assistant manager at his last club, Palomeque was named interim for two occasions (2001 and 2002), with his side in the third level. He was later appointed manager of several clubs in the fourth and fifth levels from 2003 to 2009.

On 17 June 2013, after spending four years in charge of the youth setup of EF Los Alcázares, Palomeque was named CD Algar manager. The club eventually became Cartagena's reserve squad in 2014, and he was appointed manager of the latter on 19 December, replacing Simón Ruiz.

References

External links

Soccerway profile

1967 births
Living people
Sportspeople from Cartagena, Spain
Spanish footballers
Footballers from the Region of Murcia
Association football midfielders
Segunda División players
Segunda División B players
Tercera División players
UD Salamanca players
Real Murcia players
AD Ceuta footballers
FC Cartagena footballers
Spanish football managers
FC Cartagena managers
Lorca Deportiva CF managers